The 12 Hours of Casablanca was a sports car endurance race organised on the route of the future Ain-Diab Circuit in Morocco. Only two editions were held in 1952 and 1953, before the race was replaced by the Moroccan Grand Prix in Agadir for the 1954 season.

History
The race was held on a road circuit, partially on the main road from Casablanca, that was initially 4.2 kilometers long in 1952. By 1953, the route was changed to 3.26 kilometers. The competition was intended for sports racing cars and for passenger cars as well. The starting grid was of a 'Le Mans start'-type.

1952

In December 1952, the first edition of the 12 Hours of Casablanca race was held. 24 entrants had started the race, but only 14 of them finished and were classified.

1953

The second edition of the endurance race was held in 1953. This time 17 cars finished the race. Casimiro de Oliveira and Alberto Ascari had crashed during practice in their Ferrari 375 MM and had to change teams and cars. Luckily for Ascari, he joined Luigi Villoresi in the Ferrari 500 Mondial and arrived second at the finish line in the actual race. The 500 Mondial that won its class, was based on a Ferrari 625 TF berlinetta chassis that was destroyed in a fire, rebodied by Scaglietti and equipped with a 2.0-litre engine. Charles Pozzi, who won the first edition with his Talbot-Lago T26GS, failed to arrive for the race.

Demise
Between 1954 and 1956, no motor racing was organized on this dangerous road circuit and the racing was moved to the Agadir area. Ain-Diab was more suited for the bicycle races. In 1957, the race route was refitted and increased to 7.618 kilometers thanks to the Royal Automobile Club of Morocco. The new track was named Ain-Diab Circuit and hosted the first official Moroccan Grand Prix in 1957.

References

Sports car races
Endurance motor racing
Sport in Casablanca
Motorsport competitions in Morocco